James "Jimmy" H. Walsh (21 November 1923 – 30 May 2018) was an Irish medical doctor and former Deputy Chief Medical Officer to the Government of Ireland.

Background
Walsh was born in Dublin, Ireland to Ena Warren and James Walsh from County Wexford. Jimmy's grandfather, also named James Walsh, was a dispensary doctor who had founded a fever hospital and inspired Jimmy to study medicine. Walsh attended Castleknock College before studying undergraduate medicine at the Royal College of Surgeons in Ireland and later public health at University College Dublin.

Career
Walsh and his wife, Nancy, emigrated to England in the 1950s where Walsh worked for the National Health Service. After returning to Ireland, Walsh was appointed medical inspector at the Department of Health where he later became Deputy Chief Medical Officer. In 1976, he co-founded the Royal College of Physicians of Ireland Faculty of Public Health Medicine, of which he was later made Dean. He was involved in the development of Cork University Hospital and Beaumont Hospital.

Personal life
In 1953, Walsh married Nancy O'Brien, a nurse from Ferns, County Wexford whom he had met that year at the Meath Hospital. They had 3 children - Paul, Ann, and James - who were born in England. When Nancy was diagnosed with breast cancer, the family return to Ireland, where Nancy died in June 1964. Walsh later remarried and his second wife, Patricia, died in 2005.

References

Alumni of the Royal College of Surgeons in Ireland
Alumni of University College Dublin
Department of Health (Ireland)
Health in the Republic of Ireland
 
1923 births
2018 deaths